Short track speed skating at the 1994 Winter Olympics was held from 22 to 26 February. Six events were contested at the Hamar Olympic Amphitheatre. In short track speed skating's second Olympic appearance, two events were added, the 500 metres for the men and the 1000 metres for the women.

Medal summary

Medal table

South Korea led the medal table with six, including four golds. The medal for the Australian men's relay team was the country's first in the Winter Olympics. Chun Lee-kyung led the individual medal table, with two gold medals. The top men's medalists were Chae Ji-hoon and Mirko Vuillermin, who won one gold and one silver.

Men's events

Women's events

Participating NOCs
Nineteen nations competed in the short track events at Lillehammer. Bulgaria, Mongolia, South Africa and Sweden made their short track debuts, while Russia and Kazakhstan competed for the first time as independent countries after having been part of the Unified Team in 1992.

References

 
1994 Winter Olympics events
1994
1994 in short track speed skating